The 1983–84 Tulsa Golden Hurricane men's basketball team represented the University of Tulsa as a member of the Missouri Valley Conference during the 1983–84 college basketball season. The Golden Hurricane played their home games at the Tulsa Convention Center. Led by head coach Nolan Richardson, they finished the season 27–4 overall and 13–3 in conference play to finish tied atop the MVC standings. The Golden Hurricane won the MVC tournament to receive an automatic bid to the NCAA tournament as the No. 4 seed in the Mideast region. Tulsa lost to No. 5 seed Louisville in the round of 32.

Roster

Schedule and results

|-
!colspan=9 style=| Regular season

|-
!colspan=9 style=| MVC Tournament

|-
!colspan=9 style=| NCAA Tournament

Rankings

References

Tulsa Golden Hurricane men's basketball seasons
Tulsa
Tulsa Golden Hurricane men's b
Tulsa Golden Hurricane men's b
Tulsa